The Buffalo Peaks Wilderness is a U.S. Wilderness Area located in San Isabel and Pike National Forests in central Colorado.  The  wilderness was named after two highly eroded volcanic mountains, East Buffalo Peak and West Buffalo Peak, in the Mosquito Range and was established in 1993. The wilderness contains Colorado's largest herd of bighorn sheep.

See also
East Buffalo Peak
West Buffalo Peak

References

External links
 Buffalo Peaks Wilderness at the United States Department of Agriculture Forest Service
 Buffalo Peaks Wilderness at Recreation.gov

Wilderness areas of Colorado
Protected areas established in 1993
Protected areas of Chaffee County, Colorado
Protected areas of Park County, Colorado
Protected areas of Lake County, Colorado
San Isabel National Forest
Pike National Forest
1993 establishments in Colorado